Bhuvanaikabahu IV was the first King of Gampola who ruled from 1344/5 to 1353/4. He succeeded his father Vijayabahu V of Dambadeniya and became the King of Gampola. He was succeeded by his brother Parakkamabahu V. 

He is noted for wearing spectacles made of quartz crystals. He was provided with these spectacles when he found it difficult to read inscriptions of the Gampola era. A lot of temples and Devalas like Gadaladeniya  were built during his reign.

See also
 List of Sri Lankan monarchs
 History of Sri Lanka

References

External links
 Kings & Rulers of Sri Lanka
 Codrington's Short History of Ceylon

Monarchs of Gampola
House of Siri Sanga Bo
B
B